Mampava is a genus of snout moths. It was described by Émile Louis Ragonot in 1888.

Species
In alphabetical order:
Mampava albivittella (Hampson, 1901)
Mampava bipunctella Ragonot, 1888
Mampava pulverea (Hampson, 1917)
Mampava rhodoneura (Turner, 1905)

References

Tirathabini
Pyralidae genera
Taxa named by Émile Louis Ragonot